Calochortus leichtlinii is a species of flowering plant in the lily family known by the common names Leichtlin's mariposa, smokey mariposa, and mariposa lily.

The plant is native to the Sierra Nevada and Modoc Plateau of California and adjacent parts of the Great Basin in southeastern Oregon and western Nevada. It grows in coniferous forest and chaparral habitats, including the lowest grassy hills—such as along the Sierra Nevada boundary with the Central Valley and agriculture.

The small underground bulbs were eaten by the Native Americans.

Description
Calochortus leichtlinii is a perennial herb producing an erect, unbranching stem up to 60 centimeters tall. The basal leaf is 10 to 15 centimeters long and withers by flowering.

The inflorescence is a loose cluster of 1 to 5 erect, bell-shaped flowers. Each flower has three petals 1 to 4 centimeters long which are white, pinkish, or dull blue in color and spotted with yellow and dark red or black and hairy at the bases. These color patterns vary widely among different regional and local populations.

The fruit is a narrow capsule up to 6 centimeters long.

References

External links

Jepson Manual Treatment of Calochortus leichtlinii
United States Department of Agriculture Plants Profile for Calochortus leichtlinii
Calochortus leichtlinii — Calphotos Photos gallery, University of California

leichtlinii
Flora of California
Flora of Nevada
Flora of the Sierra Nevada (United States)
Endemic flora of the United States
Plants described in 1870
Taxa named by Joseph Dalton Hooker